Snow Lake may refer to:

Lakes
Pakistan
Snow Lake (Pakistan) or Lukpe Lawo, a glacial basin

United States
Snow Lake (Calhoun County, Arkansas); see List of lakes of Calhoun County, Arkansas
Snow Lake (Idaho), an alpine lake
Snow Lake (Nevada), a glacial tarn
Snow Lake (New Mexico), a small reservoir
Snow Lake (King County, Washington)
Snow Lake (Mount Rainier), in Lewis County, Washington
Snow Lakes system in the Alpine Lakes Wilderness, Washington

Communities
Snow Lake, Manitoba, Canada
Snow Lake, Arkansas, United States

Other uses
Snow Lake Airport, serving Snow Lake, Manitoba
Snow Lake Water Aerodrome, serving Snow Lake, Manitoba
Snow Lake Peak, in Nevada